Gilges is a surname. Notable people with the surname include:

Hilarius Gilges (1909–1933), Afro-German actor and communist
 (born 1941), German politician
Simone Gilges (born 1973), contemporary artist

German-language surnames